The Latvian National Symphony Orchestra (LNSO) is a Latvian orchestra based in Riga.  Its primary performance venue is the Great Guild Hall in Riga.  In addition to regular symphonic concerts, the orchestra also broadcasts and records.

History
The orchestra was founded in 1926 as the Latvian Radio Centre Orchestra, with Arvīds Pārups as its founding music director, and was the first permanent orchestra in the country.  The LNSO is a six-time winner of the Latvian Grand Music Award (1993, 2009, 2012, 2013, 2016 and 2019).

Since 2013, the music director of the LNSO is Andris Poga.  He is scheduled to conclude his chief conductorship of the LNSO at the close of the 2021-2022 season.  In May 2021, the LNSO announced the appointment of Kristiina Poska as its next principal guest conductor, the first female conductor to be named to the post, effective in the autumn of 2021, with an initial contract of two seasons.

In January 2022, Tarmo Peltokoski first guest-conducted the LNSO.  In May 2022, the LNSO announced the appointment of Peltokoski as its next music director and artistic director, effective with the 2022-2023 season. His inauguration concert was held on November 19, 2022 in Cēsis Concert Hall.

Music Directors and Chief Conductors
 Arvīds Pārups (1926–1928)
 Jānis Mediņš (1929–1944)
 Dmitrijs Kuļkovs (1945–1949)
 Edgars Tons (1963–1966)
 Leonīds Vīgners (1949–1963, 1966–1974)
 Vassily Sinaisky (1975–1987)
 Paul Mägi (1990–1994)
 Terje Mikkelsen (1997–2001)
 Olari Elts (2001–2005)
 Karel Mark Chichon (2009–2012)
 Andris Poga (2013–2021)
 Tarmo Peltokoski (2022–present)

References

External links
 Official website of the Latvian National Symphony Orchestra

Classical music in Latvia
Latvian orchestras
Musical groups established in 1926
National orchestras
Arts organizations established in 1926